The 2020 Three Days of Bruges–De Panne is a road cycling one-day race that took place on 21 October 2020 in Belgium. It was the 44th edition of the Three Days of Bruges–De Panne, and the 22nd event of the 2020 UCI World Tour.

Teams
Twenty-five teams were invited to the race, which included seventeen UCI WorldTour teams and eight UCI Professional Continental teams.

UCI WorldTeams

 
 
 
 
 
 
 
 
 
 
 
 
 
 
 
 
 

UCI Professional Continental Teams

Result

References

Three Days of Bruges-De Panne
Three Days of Bruges-De Panne
Three Days of Bruges-De Panne
Three Days of Bruges–De Panne
Three Days of Bruges–De Panne